Suzy Wouters (born 5 March 1968 in Leuven) is a Belgian-Flemish nationalist politician for Vlaams Belang.

Since January 2019, she has been a councilor in Scherpenheuvel-Zichem for the Vlaams Belang. A few months later, in the Flemish elections of 26 May 2019, she also became a member of the Flemish Parliament for the Flemish Brabant electoral district.

References 

1968 births
Living people
Vlaams Belang politicians
Members of the Flemish Parliament
21st-century Belgian politicians